The Mark Twain Tree was a giant sequoia tree located in the Giant Forest of Kings Canyon National Park. It was named after the American writer and humorist Mark Twain. It had a diameter of  when it was felled in 1891.

The process of felling the tree took 13 days and was carried out by lumbermen Bill Mills and S.D. Phips, with assistance from Barney and John Lukey.  The tree was later shipped to the American Museum of Natural History in New York and the British Museum in London at the expense of Collis P. Huntington, the president of The Southern Pacific. Despite the establishment of the Sequoia National Park, access to the sequoia groves was difficult and the existence of such large trees was not widely believed at the time.

Big Stump
The Mark Twain stump, the remains of the tree, are preserved as part of the Big Stump Picnic Area in Kings Canyon National Park. The stump is near the entrance to Grant Grove.

See also
 List of largest giant sequoias
 List of individual trees

References

History of the Sierra Nevada (United States)
Individual giant sequoia trees